Megalithic markings, megalithic graffiti marks, megalithic symbols or non-Brahmi symbols are markings found on mostly potsherds found in Central India, South India and Sri Lanka during the Megalithic Iron Age period. A number of scholars have tried to decipher the symbols since 1878, and currently there is no consensus as to whether they constitute undeciphered writing or graffiti or symbols without any syllabic or alphabetic meaning.

History 
Megalithic markings are usually found in burial sites but are also found in habitation sites as well. They are tentatively dated from 1000 BCE to 300 CE marking the transition of the proto-historic period into the historic period of South Asia. From archaeological stratigraphy, potsherds with and without symbols are usually found at the lowest level, followed by potsherds with mixed symbols and Brahmi or Tamil-Brahmi and eventually at the highest level potsherds are only found with Brahmi or Tamil-Brahmi etchings. From around 300 CE, they disappear from grave sites.

Relationship to Indus script 

In 1960, archaeologist B. B. Lal found that 89% of the surveyed megalithic symbols had their counterparts amongst the Indus script. He concluded that there was a commonness of culture between the Indus Valley civilisation and the later megalithic period. In 2019, archaeologists in Tamil Nadu excavated further potsherds at Keeladi with graffiti closely resembling symbols of the Indus script.

Archaeological findings 
In 1935 a dish dating to the 1st century BCE and bearing megalithic graffiti symbols was discovered in Sulur, near Coimbatore in Tamil Nadu. In a 2001 publication, Mahadevan argued that the inscription on the dish contained symbols similar to those of the Indus script and also that the symbols are in same order as those of a comparable inscription on a tablet from Harappa. Mahadevan suggested that was evidence that the languages of the inscriptions were related.

In February 2006, a stone celt was discovered in Sembiyankandiyur village, near Mayiladuthurai, Tamil Nadu. The celt dates to the early 2nd millennium BCE, postdating the Harappan decline, and bears markings that Mahadevan identified as being identical with symbols of the Indus script. He argued that to be evidence that the language used by the neolithic people of south India was also used by the late Harappans.

In May 2007, the Tamil Nadu State Department of Archaeology (TNSDA) found pots with arrow-head symbols during an excavation in Melaperumpallam, a village near Puhar, Mayiladuthurai. The symbols were reported to have a striking resemblance to seals unearthed in Mohenjo-daro, in present-day Pakistan, in the 1920s.

See also 
 Anaikoddai seal
 Early Indian epigraphy
 South Indian Inscriptions
 Tamil inscriptions

Notes

References

Sources 

 
 
 
 

Ancient Indian culture
Archaeology of India
Graffiti in India
History of Tamil Nadu
History of Sri Lanka
History of Karnataka
History of Kerala
History of Andhra Pradesh
History of Telangana
Indian inscriptions
Indus Valley civilisation
Iron Age Asia
Obsolete writing systems
Proto-writing
Tamilakam
Tamil Brahmi script
Undeciphered writing systems